The St. Louis, Iron Mountain and Southern Railway (St. L., I. M. & S.), commonly known as the Iron Mountain, was an American railway company that operated from 1874 until 1917 when it was merged into the Missouri Pacific Railroad.

History
The Iron Mountain was initially established to deliver iron ore from Iron Mountain to St. Louis, Missouri. In 1883 the railway was acquired by Jay Gould, becoming part of a  system. On May 12, 1917, the company was officially merged into the Missouri Pacific Railroad, which in turn was merged into the Union Pacific Railroad in 1982. It was robbed twice, once by the James-Younger Gang, on January 31, 1874, at Gad's Hill, and once by the "One-Time Train Robbery Gang", on November 3, 1893, at Olyphant, Arkansas.

Heritage railroad

Notes

See also 

St. Louis, Iron Mountain and Southern Railway 5
St. Louis Southwestern Railway
Dardanelle and Russellville Railroad
Mississippian Railway
Little Rock and Fort Smith Railroad

References

External links

Corporate history at the Missouri Pacific Historical Society
Texas Short Line. St. Louis, Iron Mountain, and Southern Railway Company, 1878 at Cartography Associates

 
1874 mergers and acquisitions
1917 mergers and acquisitions
American companies established in 1874
American companies disestablished in 1917
Companies based in St. Louis
Defunct Arkansas railroads
Defunct Illinois railroads
Defunct Louisiana railroads
Defunct Kansas railroads
Defunct Oklahoma railroads
Defunct Tennessee railroads
Former Class I railroads in the United States
Heritage railroads in Missouri
Railway companies established in 1874
Railway companies disestablished in 1917
Standard gauge railways in the United States
Tourist attractions in Cape Girardeau County, Missouri